William A. Storey (January 4, 1854 – July 29, 1917) was the mayor of Portland, Oregon, United States, from 1899 to 1900.  He later served as Multnomah County Sheriff, from 1902 to 1904.

Born in Machias, Maine, Storey moved to Oregon in 1877.  He was elected to the Portland city council in 1898. After the death of mayor William S. Mason while in office, Storey was elected by the council to serve the remainder of Mason's mayoral term.  After initially serving as acting mayor for several weeks, Storey was elected as mayor by the council on May 16, 1899, and sworn-in on May 17.

Storey ran for public election to the office in spring 1900, but was defeated by Henry S. Rowe, who took office on July 2, 1900.

References

Mayors of Portland, Oregon
1854 births
1917 deaths
People from Machias, Maine
Oregon sheriffs